Astrid Aarhus Byrknes (born 9 April 1963) is a Norwegian politician for the Christian Democratic Party.

In 2007 she became mayor of Lindås, succeeding Tove Linnea Brandvik.

She served as a deputy representative to the Parliament of Norway from Hordaland during the terms 2009–2013 and 2013–2017.

References

1963 births
Living people
People from Lindås
Deputy members of the Storting
Christian Democratic Party (Norway) politicians
Mayors of places in Hordaland
21st-century Norwegian women politicians
21st-century Norwegian politicians
Women members of the Storting